John Marshall Smith (September 27, 1906 – May 9, 1982) was a utility player in Major League Baseball who played briefly for the Boston Red Sox during the  season. Listed at 6'1", 180 lb., Smith was a switch-hitter and threw right-handed. He was born in Washington, D.C. and went to Eastern High School.

Smith appeared in four career games with Boston basically as a backup for first baseman Bill Sweeney. He posted a .133 batting average (2-for-15) with two runs and one RBI without extrabases. At first base, he collected 46 outs and did not commit an error for a perfect 1.000 fielding percentage.

Smith died at the age of 75 in Silver Spring, Maryland.

References

External links
 Baseball Reference

Major League Baseball first basemen
Boston Red Sox players
Baseball players from Washington, D.C.
1906 births
1982 deaths
Eastern High School (Washington, D.C.) alumni